The Israeli city of Haifa is divided into nine quarters, which are subdivided into subquaters, which are further divided into neighborhoods.

This is a list of the neighborhoods of Haifa.

Alphabetical list:
 Ahuza (Horev)
 Bat Galim
 Carmel Center: see Merkaz HaCarmel
 Carmel Ma'aravi (Western Carmel)
 Carmel Tzarfati: see French Carmel
 Carmeliya
 Denia (Hod HaCarmel)
 Ein HaYam
 French Carmel (Carmel Tzarfati)
 German Colony
 HaCarmel: see Denia
 Hadar Elyon
 Hadar HaCarmel
 Halisa
 Hod HaCarmel: see Denia
 Horev: see Ahuza
 Kiryat Eliezer
 Kiryat Eliyahu
 Kiryat Haim
 Kiryat Rabin (Government District)
 Kiryat Shmuel
 Kababir
 Merkaz HaCarmel (Carmel Center)
 Neve Paz
 Neve Sha'anan
 Neve Yosef
 Ramat Almogi
 Ramat Alon
 Ramat Alon South
 Ramat Begin (Soroka)
 Ramat Chen
 Ramat Denia
 Ramat Eshkol
 Ramat Golda
 Ramat HaTishbi
 Ramat Haviv
 Ramat Remez
 Ramot Ben-Gurion: see Romema
 Ramot Sapir
 Romema (The Romemot, Ramot Ben-Gurion)
 Shambur
 Kiryat Sprinzak
 Soroka: see Ramat Begin
 Stella Maris
 Vardiya
 Wadi Nisnas
 Wadi Salib
 Western Carmel: see Carmel Ma'aravi